The  is an independent professional baseball league on the island of Shikoku in Japan. (None of the teams in Nippon Professional Baseball are based in Shikoku.) The league currently has four teams, and has its league headquarters in Takamatsu.

The Shikoku Island League has two principal sponsors, the Shikoku Railway Company (JR Shikoku) and the Shikoku Coca-Cola Bottling Company. Other sponsors include Taiyo Oil Company, Shikoku Meiji Dairies, Japan Airlines, sporting goods maker Mizuno Corp., Internet service provider Biglobe, convenience store chain FamilyMart, and Nihon McDonald's.

The Shikoku Island League Plus is part of the Japan Independent Baseball League Organization (which also includes the Baseball Challenge League).

League play
Originally, each team played 90 games per season: 45 at home and 45 away. With the 2008 expansion, each team's schedule changed to 80 games a year, 40 at home and 40 away, so the season consists of 240 games. Teams attempt to schedule games for Fridays, Saturdays, and Sundays. Friday games are night games. (Until the 2011 season, the Kōchi Fighting Dogs lacked the necessary lighting equipment and had to play all their home games during the day.)

The Shikoku Island League uses designated hitters.

One technique the league uses to strengthen its ties to the locales where it plays is to have those players who come from Shikoku play for their home teams. Even if they are not regulars, they often appear as designated hitters, pinch hitters, relief pitchers, and substitutes.

History 
The league was originally known as the Shikoku Island League. It was founded by former Nippon Professional Baseball star Hiromichi Ishige under the corporate ownership of IBLJ Inc. (an abbreviation of "Independent Baseball League of Japan"). The first game in the league took place on April 29, 2005. On November 10, 2005, the Kochi Fighting Dogs won the first league championship.

The league initially held all the rights to the teams, leadership and players, but in 2006 established separate corporations for the teams.

The Red Warblers only lasted through the 2009 season. and a new team was added, the Mie Three Arrows. The Saints withdrew from the league following the 2010 season, while the Three Arrows folded after the 2011 season.

The Japan Independent Baseball League Organization was formed during the summer of 2014.

In June 2015, an all-star team of players of the Shikoku Island League played against all the teams from the independent Can-Am League in North America. They finished with a record of 6-10. An all-star team returned for the 2016 Can-Am League season, finishing with a record of 8-12.

Teams
Each team has 22 players, two coaches, and one manager.

Former Teams

League statistics

References

External links
Shikoku Island League plus Official Site (in Japanese)
Shikoku Island League Information Bureau (in Japanese)

Baseball leagues in Japan
Sports leagues established in 2005
2005 establishments in Japan
Professional sports leagues in Japan